Limnellia surtsuri is a species of fly in the family Ephydridae.

Distribution
Great Britain, Iceland.

References

Ephydridae
Insects described in 1971
Diptera of Europe